Andy Kerr (born May 29, 1955) is a conservation advocate, consultant, lobbyist, lecturer, and writer in Oregon. He has been involved in conservation efforts including protecting timber habitat of the northern spotted owl from logging, water for salmon and sucker fish in the Klamath Basin (Klamath Water Crisis), and the creation of Steens Mountain Wilderness and other preserves. He worked for the Oregon Natural Resources Council (later renamed Oregon Wild) in the 1970s and the Wilderness Society in 2000. The Oregonian said he was the most famous environmentalist in the state during the northern spotted owl timber controversy. He played a leading role in advocating for the Steens Mountain Wilderness preserve area. He also advocated, unsuccessfully, for population control measures in Oregon.

According to the biography page on his website, Kerr is a fifth-generation Oregonian and was born and raised in Creswell, Oregon, a former timber town in the upper Willamette Valley. He now lives in Ashland, Oregon and Washington, D.C.

When Kerr bought a log house in Eastern Oregon during the 1990s it caused some controversy because of his anti-logging advocacy.

Personal life
Kerr married Nancy Peterson. In 2009 he was engaged to Randi Spivak, who worked for the Center for Biological Diversity.

Bibliography
Oregon Desert Guide: 70 Hikes, The Mountaineers Books, 2000
Oregon Wild: Endangered Forest Wilderness, Timber Press, 2004

References

External links
Biography page on Andy Kerr's website
Open letter to Andy Kerr 1994

1955 births
Living people
American environmentalists
Activists from Oregon
People from Creswell, Oregon
Writers from Ashland, Oregon